This is a partial list of governors of the Venezuelan state of Bolívar. Until 1989 they were appointed by the president of Venezuela. Starting from that year they were elected in universal, direct and secret elections.

Appointed governors

Modern governors
 Governors chosen by popular election

See also 
 States of Venezuela

References

External links
 Cuadro Comparativo Gobernadores Electos por Entidad Elecciones 1989-1992-1995-1998-2000.
 CNE: Elecciones Regionales del 2004.
 CNE: Elecciones Regionales del 2008
 CNE: Elecciones Regionales del 2012
 CNE: Elecciones Regionales del 2017
 Venezuela vote dispute escalates foreign sanctions threat (2017)

Bolivar